The flag of North Dakota represents the U.S. state of North Dakota. Adopted on March 11, 1911, its design is an almost exact copy of the unit banner carried by the state's troop contingent in the Philippine–American War.

History
The flag design was passed by the North Dakota Legislative Assembly on March 3, 1911, although the color was not precisely specified at that time. Legislation in 1943 brought the flag in line with the original troop banner, which is on display at the North Dakota Heritage Center in Bismarck. The flag also resembles the Great Seal of the United States.

Design and specifications
The flag's official proportions are 33:26, significantly shorter than many other state flags; however, in practice, the flag is produced and sold in 5:3 ratios. The state code specifies that the flag must be made of blue silk or some other material that is capable of 

By law, the design of the flag is identical to that carried by the First North Dakota Infantry during the Spanish–American War and the Philippine–American War.

It is one of eight U.S. state flags to feature an eagle, alongside those of Illinois, Iowa, Michigan, New York, Oregon, Pennsylvania and Utah.

See also
 Flags of governors of the U.S. states
 Symbols of the state of North Dakota
 Seal of North Dakota

References

External links
 Information about the flag on the official website of the State of North Dakota

United States state flags
Flag
Flags of North Dakota
North Dakota